The John Pearson Soda Works, also referred to as the Placerville Soda Works, is a historic rustic vernacular Victorian brick building in Placerville, El Dorado County, California. The building, in the Gold Country region, was placed on the National Register of Historic Places (NRHP) on December 12, 1985. The building housed the Cozmic Café coffee shop and venue from 2003 until 2018.

History

19th century 
The John Pearson Soda Works structure was built in several stages: The previous building on the site burned down in a devastating fire that affected most of Placerville in the 1850s. Scottish immigrant John McFarland Pearson built the lower portion of the building in 1859 as a commercial ice house. He chose to build in front of an idle mine shaft so he could use the underground rooms and tunnels to store ice at controlled temperatures. Pearson later expanded into soda water; his sons added the brick second story in 1897 to house the bottling operation. They added a water-driven elevator to transport the product from each level. The store also sold other groceries such as eggs and beer.

20th century 
The business changed hands several times, though the building remained in the Pearson family for some time.  The Pearson sons sold the business in 1904 to the Scherrer Bros., who in turn sold it in 1934 to Robert Hook, who turned it into a Coca-Cola Bottling franchise.

The structure held other businesses until the Pearson family sold the building in 1972 to antique collector Roger John Douvres, who restored the structure over a period of four years, using the lower section as an old-fashioned soda fountain and the upper portion as an elegant dining hall decorated in early 20th-century style.  Douvres' daughter had the building successfully placed on the National Register of Historic Places.  The structure has also housed a theater, antique store, bookstore, music store and the Placerville Coffee House before becoming The Cozmic Café in 2003.

Another nearby soda works building, the Fountain-Tallman Soda Works, is also listed on the National Register of Historic Places.

See also
 Fountain-Tallman Soda Works
National Register of Historic Places listings in El Dorado County, California

References

External links
Official National Register of Historical Places in El Dorado County: website
 The Cozmic Café

History of El Dorado County, California
Buildings and structures in El Dorado County, California
Placerville, California
Ice trade
Coca-Cola bottlers
Industrial buildings completed in 1859
Industrial buildings completed in 1897
Industrial buildings and structures on the National Register of Historic Places in California
Vernacular architecture in California
Victorian architecture in California
National Register of Historic Places in El Dorado County, California
Drink companies based in California